The Missionszentrale der Franziskaner (MZF, Franciscan mission centre) is a German development charity association of the Franciscan order, based in Bonn-Bad Godesberg and operating in many countries. It is focused on development of humanitarian, social and pastoral projects, and on education, information and human rights.

History 

The Second Vatican Council inspired German Franciscans to found in 1969 a charity organisation which follows Francis of Assisi: supporting and representing the poor. It runs projects in Afrika, Asia, Oceania, Latin America as well as in Eastern Europe. In 2003, the MZF initiated the Bank für Orden und Mission (Bank for orders and mission)

Work 

The Missionszentrale der Franziskaner follows the principles of Francis of Assisi of solidarity with the poor and protection of the environment. It is dedicated to the option for the poor. More than 220.000 Franciscans are active in around 110 countries, living and working with people in need.n The MZF supports around 600 projects in 60 countries. They are chosen by criteria:

 initiated by the people in need
 socially and environmentally sustainable
 helping people to help themselves ("Hilfe zur Selbsthilfe")

The MZF organises seminars and issues publications such as the quarterly Grüne Reihe. 
From 1999, the MZF organized a voluntary year ("Freiwilligenjahr") for young adults, who work in projects.
From 2009, the MZF has organised travels to enable meetings of people of different cultures and religions,.

References

External links 

 

Development charities based in Germany
1969 establishments in Germany
Christian organizations established in 1969
Non-profit organisations based in Bavaria